Kelver Hayward Hartley Jones (11 February 1909 – 26 February 1988) was an Australian academic and the foundation professor of French at the University of Newcastle.

Early life and career
Kelver Hartley was born Kelver Hayward Hartley Jones in the suburb of Wayville in Adelaide, South Australia on 11 February 1909. His parents were Frank Hartley Jones (1877-1958), an accountant, and his wife Clara Mary Vickery. He was an only child. He attended Sydney High School and the University of Sydney, where he studied French and from which he graduated with a B.A., majoring in French, in 1930 and an M.A. in 1932.

After graduation, he taught at secondary schools in New South Wales. In 1933 he won a scholarship from the French government, which enabled him to undertake research for a doctorate at the Sorbonne in Paris, France, for two years. He chose to research the "French influences in the writings of Oscar Wilde" and, while so doing, conducted interviews with André Gide and Lord Alfred Douglas, following which he successfully defended his thesis titled Oscar Wilde, l'influence française dans son oeuvre.

After his return to Australia in 1935, Hartley joined the Department of French at the University of Sydney for two years (1938–40) as Acting Assistant Lecturer and then taught for twenty years in New South Wales secondary schools (including Sydney Boys' High School, Newcastle Boys' High School, Armidale High School and Sydney Technical High School).

University of Newcastle
In 1955 he was appointed to the post of Senior Lecturer and Head of Department in French at the Newcastle University College in the city of Newcastle, New South Wales and was promoted to Associate Professor in 1962. 

In 1965 when the Newcastle University College became the University of Newcastle, he was appointed as the Foundation Professor of French there, occupying that Chair until he retired in 1969. During those years he was recognised as Australia's foremost expert on "comparative Franco-Italian and Franco-Spanish literary styles".

Final years
On his last day at the university, Hartley insisted on receiving all of his superannuation in cash. He cut his ties with almost all his former colleagues and students and went to live anonymously and frugally in Sydney, where for the next 19 years he invested his modest superannuation monies into a fortune which reached $1,382,359 by February 1987. His dream was to leave a bequest of $1 million which would provide travelling scholarships to support qualified students who wished to further their French studies in France.

He was a victim of the October 1987 stock market crash which reduced his fortune to less than $1 million. On about 26 February 1988 he died in the boarding house room in Glebe where he lived, the death being ruled a suspected suicide.

The money that he left behind climbed again to $1.4 million due to a rebound in the stock market and was bequeathed to the French Department of the University of Newcastle which established the Hartley Exchange Studies Scholarships and the Hartley Honours Scholarships.

Select bibliography
 Oscar Wilde: l'influence française dans son œuvre: thèse pour le doctorat d'Université, Paris: Librairie du "Recueil Sirey", 1935.
 Fifty French Proses : For Leaving Certificate Course (3rd to 5th Year) : With Vocabulary, Sydney: Shakespeare Head Press, c. 1946. Joint author: C. R. Goffet (Charles Goffet).
 Bandello and the Heptameron: A Study in Comparative Literature, Melbourne University Press on behalf of the Australian Humanities Research Council, 1960.
 Hermsprong de Robert Bage: un roman philosophique anglais, Paris: Marcel Didier, n.d. Also titled: Revue de littérature comparée.
 The Haunting of Dr McCuaig, Mount Nebo, Queensland.: Boombana Publications, 1997. Edited and presented by Kenneth R. Dutton. 
 Eerie Tales, Mount Nebo, Queensland.: Boombana Publications, c. 2001. Edited and presented by Kenneth R. Dutton.

Further reading
 Kenneth R. Dutton, Kelver Hartley: A Memoir: Reminiscences and Documents Relating to the Life of Emeritus Professor Kelver Hayward Hartley (1909-1988), Newcastle, N.S.W., Hartley Bequest Program, University of Newcastle, 1995.
 Foveaux Kirby, Kelver Hartley (A Life in Progress): A Playscript, Mt. Nebo, Queensland: Boombana Publications, c. 2004. With an introduction by Kenneth R. Dutton.
 Chris Mikul, Bizarrism, Scb distributors, 2016; London: Headpress, 2016, revised and expanded edition.

References

External links
 Professor Kelver Hartley, Professor of French, the University of Newcastle - 1968
 The Hartley Collection at University of Newcastle (N.S.W.)
 Kelver Hartley Remembered
 Meeting Kelver Hartley
 Reciprocity - Kelver Hartley Memorial Address, 1997, delivered by Jean-Paul Delamotte

1909 births
1988 deaths
20th-century Australian educators
Australian literary critics
Literary critics of French
Academic staff of the University of Newcastle (Australia)
University of Sydney alumni
University of Paris alumni
Australian schoolteachers
Writers from Adelaide
20th-century Australian male writers